The Best Boxer ESPY Award is presented annually to the professional or amateur boxer, irrespective of nationality, adjudged to be the best in a given calendar year. Active between 1993 and 2006, the Best Boxer ESPY Award was subsumed from 2007-2018 by the Best Fighter ESPY Award, for which both boxers and mixed martial arts fighters were eligible, and then revived in 2019 when a separate ESPY Award was created for Best MMA Fighter.

Between 1993 and 2004, the award voting panel comprised variously fans; sportswriters and broadcasters, sports executives, and ESPN personalities, termed collectively experts; and retired sportspersons, but balloting thereafter was exclusively by fans over the Internet from amongst choices selected by the ESPN Select Nominating Committee.

Through the 2001 iteration of the ESPY Awards, ceremonies were conducted in February of each year to honor achievements over the previous calendar year; awards presented thereafter were conferred in June and reflected performance from the June previous.

List of winners

See also
The Ring magazine Fighter of the Year
Sugar Ray Robinson Award, by the Boxing Writers Association of America

Notes

References

ESPY Awards
Boxing awards
Awards established in 2003
Awards disestablished in 2006